Cory Hardrict (born November 9, 1979) is an American actor. He has appeared in film and television since the late 1990s.

Personal life
Hardrict was born in Chicago, Illinois. After dating for six years, Hardrict and actress Tia Mowry were engaged on Christmas Day 2006. They married on April 20, 2008, in Santa Barbara, California. In 2011, Mowry's first pregnancy was chronicled on the reality TV show Tia & Tamera starring her and her twin sister on the Style Network. Hardrict and Mowry have a son named Cree Taylor born on June 28, 2011, and a daughter named Cairo Tiahna born on May 5, 2018.  On October 4, 2022, it was announced that Mowry and Hardrict have separated due to irreconcilable differences.

Career

He began his career on television during the late 1990s, with appearances in weekly prime-time programs including Smart Guy, That's So Raven, Felicity, Once and Again and ER. He made his film debut in the 1999 romantic comedy Never Been Kissed, starring Drew Barrymore, followed by a role in the drama Crazy/Beautiful (2001). Hardrict has also appeared in Creature Unknown (2004), Miles from Home (2006), and Driftwood (2006) also starred in the Netflix original movie Brotherly Love as the big brother of two younger siblings.

Hardrict co-starred in the film Hollywood Horror with wife Tia Mowry and her twin sister Tamera Mowry. Later that year, he appeared in the romantic comedy He's Just Not That Into You, and the drama Dough Boys.  Hardrict also had a guest appearance on the CW show The Game with wife Tia Mowry as the cable guy in the "Hill Street Blues" episode.  Hardrict also appeared as Ryan in the pilot episode of the CBS sitcom Accidentally on Purpose.  However, he was subsequently replaced by Pooch Hall (his wife's co-star from The Game).

In 2007, he had a recurring role on the ABC Family series Lincoln Heights and executive produced the film Neighborhood Watch, in which he also starred. The following year, he had a supporting role in the movie Gran Torino directed by and starring Clint Eastwood. That same year, he appeared as singer Brandy's love interest in the music video for "Right Here (Departed)".

In 2015, he had a role in the film American Sniper, also directed by Eastwood. In 2015, he played the older brother June, who takes care of his family by any means necessary, in the film Brotherly Love alongside Keke Palmer and Eric D. Hill Jr. In 2017, he played Jacques Agnant in the Tupac Shakur biopic titled All Eyez on Me, alongside Demetrius Shipp Jr., Danai Gurira and Money-B.

Filmography

Film

Television

References

External links
 
 

1979 births
Living people
Male actors from Chicago
American male film actors
Film producers from Illinois
20th-century American male actors
21st-century American male actors
African-American male actors
American male television actors
People from Sauk Village, Illinois
20th-century African-American people
21st-century African-American people